Herlufsholm School is a private day and boarding school by the River Suså in Næstved, about  south of Copenhagen. Herlufsholm was founded in 1565 as a boarding school for "sons of noble and other honest men" on the site of a former Benedictine monastery from the 12th century.

Herlufsholm has been co-educational since the 1960s for day students, as of 1985 for boarding pupils. The student body currently exceeds 600 students, of which approximately 275 students are boarders who lived in the dormitories. The pupils follow a 10-day programme with lessons on Saturdays followed by 3-day weekends. The school offers a range of education: from 6th grade in the Danish lower-secondary school; the optional 10th grade; the three grades in upper-secondary school and the international programs: a preparatory class (1–2 year) with IGCSE exams and the International Baccalaureate Programme.

The founding of the school 
Herlufsholm is built on the site of a Benedictine monastery, founded in 1135, of which the church and a few other remnants are preserved and in daily use by the students and staff. The monastery was originally called Sct. Peder’s Monastery, but over the years it became known as Skovkloster. It was seized by King Christian III of Denmark during the Reformation in Denmark–Norway and Holstein in 1536. The king allowed the monks to remain, and the last monk left the monastery in 1559 in favour of another monastery in the close by city of Sorø.

Danish naval officer and hero, Admiral of the Fleet Herluf Trolle  (1516–1565) and his wife Birgitte Gøye (1511–1574) took possession of the monastery in 1560 in exchange of their home Hillerødsholm (which later became Frederiksborg Palace). The couple changed the name into Herlufsholm and founded the school in May 1565, but Herluf Trolle never saw their dream materialise because he was fatally wounded on sea during the Great Northern War; he died in Copenhagen in June 1565.

School buildings

Herlufsholm has evolved over a couple of centuries, with many characteristic changes in the past 50 years. The school campus still retains a Gothic appearance thanks to the former abbey church and the adjoining building, Klosterbygningen ("Monastery Building"), of which the only original part remaining is the cellars – the present building is from the 1870s. Klosterbygningen consists of the church (in which the students gather in the morning), two dining halls, a ballroom, the provost apartment, music studies, washing facilities and other amenities.

The second largest building is Skolebygningen ("School Building") which contains two dormitories and some classrooms. Up until the middle of the 20th century most of the teaching took place here, but now less than half the school's classrooms are located here.

The third most important building is Museumsbygningen ("Museum Building"), which contains another two dormitories, the science department, the biology department and the school's collection of historical scientific apparatus and specimens of animal species, many now endangered, in a collection dating back to the 1870s.

The campus also holds a library from 1911, a small hospital, the principal's house, a few house for teachers and various other service and administrative buildings.

The rest of the classrooms are located in Gymnasiefløjen where the teaching of the secondary school pupils takes place. The Gymnasium Building is connected to the principal's office, the staffroom and Helenhallen, which is the second largest gym, also containing a stage.

The 10 school houses are:

The newest dormitory Bodil-Gården finished construction in 2010, houses the youngest boarding pupils, and is one of the three mixed-gender dorms along with Lassengården and Vuggestuen.

School spirit
Because of its origin as a monastery, the pupils are referred to internally as disciples; but they are also called Herlovianere (Herlovians) and former students are thereby Gammelherlovianere (Old Herlovians). The members of teaching staff go by the name "hører" which is Danish for "hearer" and many of them gain nicknames that some even go by in the classrooms. The headmaster and his wife are known as "Heis and Mia" respectively. A number of senior year students are appointed prefects in every house.
 
A day at Herlufsholm is structured around the three daily meals, school before and after midday, and the private 2 hour study session on either side of the evening dinner; boarding students furthermore have specific timings for going to bed depending on their year. Every morning after the first session of lectures, the school gathers in the church or the gym hall to get an update on current matters of interest and sing from their personal songbooks.

The uniform

Herlufsholm is the only school in Denmark with a compulsory uniform.
Every student for 6th to 12th grade, boarding and day students, must wear the uniform in school - except at gym class where a sports uniform is used. The school has two uniform systems: Half and Full Galla.

Students are required to wear jackets on special occasions, e.g. exams and traditional festivities, but many choose to do so on other days as well for practical reasons such as cold weather. Students in middle-school, 6th-9th, wear a double-buttoned blazer, while students in the preparatory class (10th grade) as well as all high school students wear the single-row, school blazer with the Gøye arms on the chest.

All students have to buy the two school ties, which they are obliged to wear with their blazer. The "Herlovianerslips" (Herlovian Tie) is coloured in blue and silver/white diagonal stripes running down the tie from the wearer's left. The "Gøyeslips"  (Gøye Tie) is full coloured, dark blue tie with the Gøye family crest, three pilgrims' scallops. Previously, there existed a corresponding "Trolleslips"  (Trolle Tie) with the Trolle family crest, a beheaded, red troll; but it has gone out of production for reasons unknown.

Half Galla
Half Galla is the ordinary day uniform, dating back to the 1950s, used in school as well as less formal festivities. The uniform is centered on a sky blue, button-down shirt with the Gøye family crest on the chest pocket. Students are free to combine this shirt with charcoal-grey or blue pants/skirts and pullovers - light colour variations are banned and so is black. Though, denim is not accepted in class, the students are otherwise free to wear clothes of their liking as long as it is without large prints, patterns and logos. Furthermore, students are allowed to wear classic coats, sensible black footwear and inconspicuous belts.

The correct half galla, consists of the Herlovianerslips on the blue school shirt, charcoal grey pants and school blazer. This uniform is for instance used at the Fugleskydning and final exams.

In their senior year, corresponding to 12th grade, male students wear a peaked cap with a pilgrims' scallop on oak leaves, and white pants as was previously tradition among senior navy cadets. Female students wear a dark blue sailor hat made of straw with a white band and tails, and a white, high waisted, floor-length dress with pleats and gold buttons. Prefects, all senior year, wear the Trolle crest instead of the Gøye shield worn by the rest of the school.

Full Galla
Full Galla is the uniform used in festivities and solemnity. The correct full galla, consists of a dark blue, double-breasted suit or with a comely skirt, and the Gøyeslips on a white shirt. This uniform is used at the Trollemorgen and formal school dinner parties, where the tie is replaced with a bowtie for boys; or as a whole for girls who wear galla dresses.
In their senior year, male students often wear a white bowtie, especially at graduation where the white corresponds nicely with the Danish student cap.

Herlovianersproget
A unique characteristic of the school is that the students have developed their own language called the herlovianersprog. Words are created by simply taking the first and last syllables of a word and making a portmanteau of the two. So for instance, skolebygning ("school building") becomes skygning. 

Even though the language is exclusively used at Herlufsholm, some words have been adopted into Danish. For instance "svælling" (cygnet), which had not previously featured as a word in Danish, is originally Herlovian for Svane + Ælling (Swan + duckling). So far two dictionaries have been published.

Traditions
Herlufsholm has a long list of traditions. The two biggest events of the year are:

Trolle-morgen
Trolle-morgen is on January 14 being the founder's birthday, is a major event, as many old students return to the school on that day to commemorate their founding father in the dark hour of early morning.

Fugleskydning
Fugleskydning ("bird-shooting") in mid-August starts the new school year. It is a tradition dating back to the latter part of the 19th century. Old and new students meet at the school to shoot down a wooden bird on a pole with bows and arrows.

Evidence of abuse
A May 2022 TV 2 documentary revealed evidence, including testimony and video, of a culture of bullying and sexual abuse directed at young students; the documentary provoked an emotional reaction in Denmark. In response, Education Minister Pernille Rosenkrantz-Theil was summoned to a closed session of parliament, and the school's board sacked its principal and abolished the prefect system. The entire board would itself resign the following month after sanctions and strong criticism from Denmark's National Agency for Education and Quality. The Crown Prince Couple also announced they were withdrawing Prince Christian and Princess Isabella from the school.

Notable Herlovians

Academia
Jákup Jakobsen (Linguist)
Knud Lyne Rahbek (Literary critic, writer, rector of the University of Copenhagen)
Niels Ryberg Finsen (Physician, recipient of the 1903 Nobel Prize in Medicine and Physiology)

Arts and culture
Johan Philip Asbæk (Actor)
Pilou Asbæk (Actor)
Jens Fink-Jensen (Photographer)
Nicolai Frahm (Art collector)
Sven Holm (Author)
Kristian von Hornsleth (Artist)
Marie Tetzlaff (Journalist)

Government and Politics
Christian Albrecht Bluhme (Prime Minister of Denmark, 1852–53)
Bernt Johan Collet (Danish Minister of Defence 1987–88, co-founder of CEPOS)
Joachim Gersdorff (Steward of the Danish Realm, 1650–60)
Marcus Knuth (Member of parliament, Denmark)
Hannibal Sehested (Prime Minister of Denmark, 1900–01)
Knud Sehested (Inaugural Danish Minister for Agriculture, 1896–97)
Niels Trolle (Steward of Norway, 1656–61)
Corfitz Ulfeld (Statesman and notorious traitor, 1606–1664)

Military
Søren Haslund-Christensen (Major general and Danish Hofmarschall, 1989–2003)
Anders Lassen (Major, recipient of the Victoria Cross and Military Cross & Two Bars)

Others
Prince Christian of Denmark (2021-2022 – pulled from the school shortly after completing the first years of his upper secondary education due to reports of recurring incidents of bullying, violence and sexual abuse at the school)
Sven Clausen  (Doctor of law, professor, author, playwright, poet)
Frederik Harhoff (Legal Officer at the International Criminal Tribunal for the former Yugoslavia)
Michael Møller ( Under-Secretary-General of the United Nations and current Director-General United Nations Office at Geneva  Switzerland)
Prince Nikolai of Denmark (attended from 2015–2018)
Peter Sisseck (Oenologist)
Christian Stadil (Owner of Hummel International)

See also
Herlufsholm Strand

References

External links
Herlufsholm School Website
Herlovianersamfundet
 Image

Gymnasiums in Denmark
Boarding schools in Denmark
International Baccalaureate schools in Denmark
Manor houses in Næstved Municipality
1565 establishments in Denmark
Educational institutions established in the 1560s
Buildings and structures associated with the Gøye family